Ivan Pavlovich Malinin was a Russian figure skater.

Ivan Malinin was the 1913 and 1914 champion of Russia in men's single skating.

He lost his life at the front in the First World War.

Competitive highlights

References

External links 
 Ivan Malinin at Fskate.ru

Russian male single skaters
Figure skaters from Moscow
Year of birth missing
Year of death missing